The United Hearts Movement (MCU) is a political party in the Central African Republic led by Faustin-Archange Touadéra.

History
The party was formed in November 2018 as a political association by President Faustin-Archange Touadéra, and officially took shape as a political party in early 2019. Touadéra ran under the MCU banner during the 2020 general election, which he won in the first round with 53.9% of the votes.

Electoral results

Presidential elections

References

2018 establishments in the Central African Republic
Political parties established in 2018
Political parties in the Central African Republic

Social democratic parties in Africa